Willie Duggan (4 December 1925 – 4 April 2014) was an Irish boxer. He competed in the men's middleweight event at the 1952 Summer Olympics.

References

1925 births
2014 deaths
Irish male boxers
Olympic boxers of Ireland
Boxers at the 1952 Summer Olympics
Sportspeople from Dublin (city)
Middleweight boxers